James Ingersoll Wyer (May 14, 1869 – November 1, 1955) was an American librarian and educator. Wyer earned his bachelor's degree from the New York State Library School in 1898 and accepted a position at the University of Nebraska. In Nebraska, Wyer took leadership roles in professional library associations and published a guidebook to government documents. Wyer returned to Albany, New York, receiving his master's degree in 1905 and his PhD in 1919. He held several positions of progressive responsibility in the New York State Library and its library school.

From 1916 to 1920, Wyer chaired the Library War Service Committee of the American Library Association which was a campaign to raise funds to maintain libraries in military camps, vessels and ports. He was president of the American Library Association from 1921 to 1922. In 1930, Wyer authored a textbook on reference practices, "Reference Work: A Textbook for Students of Library Work and Librarians." Wyer retired as Director of the New York State Library in 1938. He retired to Salt Lake City, Utah. In Utah, Wyer continued to be an active contributor to library journals until an illness in 1950.

References

 
 

1869 births
1955 deaths
American librarians
Presidents of the American Library Association